Iron Maiden are a British heavy metal band formed in 1975 by bassist Steve Harris. After several lineup changes prior to their recording career, they settled on Harris, vocalist Paul Di'Anno, guitarist Dave Murray and drummer Doug Sampson. The band released an EP as a four-piece, before hiring guitarist Dennis Stratton in 1979. Doug Sampson was dismissed from the band as he was unable to cope with the touring schedule and, at the suggestion of Stratton, replaced by Clive Burr, with whom the band recorded their self-titled debut album in 1980. Later that year, Stratton was replaced by guitarist Adrian Smith, due to musical and personal differences brought about by choosing not to travel with the band when supporting Kiss on the European leg of their Unmasked Tour. 

During the tour supporting their second studio effort, Di'Anno was fired from the band after drug and alcohol abuse affected his live performance. Vocalist Bruce Dickinson left his previous band, Samson, to audition for Iron Maiden in September 1981 and joined shortly afterwards. After the release of their third album, The Number of the Beast, drummer Nicko McBrain replaced Burr, who left due to personal and scheduling problems on the subsequent Beast on the Road tour. This is considered by many as their quintessential lineup, with which they released a series of high-impact works.

In 1990, prior to the recording of their eighth studio album, Smith was asked to leave the band due to a lack of enthusiasm, brought about by the "stripped-down" musical direction they were taking, which Smith considered "a step backwards" from the progressive direction they had been taking.  Janick Gers, an old friend of Dickinson's who performed on his debut solo album, became the new guitarist. This formation recorded one more album before Dickinson departed in 1993, in order to pursue his solo career further. 

The band listened to hundreds of tapes submitted by vocalists before asking Blaze Bayley to audition, with whom they would go on to release two studio albums, after which Bayley left the band by mutual consent in January 1999. At that point, the band were in talks with Dickinson, who, after a meeting with Steve Harris and Rod Smallwood (the group's manager) in Brighton, agreed to rejoin along with Adrian Smith, who was telephoned a few hours later. Iron Maiden thus became a six-piece band and have gone on to make six further studio releases. The current lineup is now the longest and most stable in the band's history.

Current members

Former members

Touring/session musicians

Timeline

Line-ups

Notes

References

 
 
 
 
 
 
 
 
 
 
 

 
Iron Maiden
Articles which contain graphical timelines